Donny Rijnink (born 14 April 1990 in Amsterdam) is a Dutch professional footballer who currently plays as a defender for ADO '20 in the Dutch Derde Divisie. He formerly played for Almere City and Telstar.

External links
 Voetbal International

1990 births
Living people
Dutch footballers
Almere City FC players
SC Telstar players
AFC Ajax (amateurs) players
ADO '20 players
Eerste Divisie players
Derde Divisie players
Footballers from Amsterdam
VV Katwijk players
Association football defenders